Aneta Soukup (born December 30, 1978) is a Canadian former professional tennis player.

Biography
Soukup was raised in Kitchener, Ontario via Prague, having emigrated to Canada from Czechoslovakia.

Coached by her father Milos, she began competing on the professional tour in the late 1990s. Soukup, a right-handed player, partnered with Renata Kolbovic to win a bronze medal in the women's doubles at the 1999 Pan American Games in Winnipeg. In 2001 and 2002, she played college tennis for the Florida Gators of the University of Florida. Her best performance on the WTA Tour came at Quebec City in 2004, making the doubles quarterfinals with Kateryna Bondarenko.

ITF finals

Singles (0–1)

Doubles (6–6)

References

External links
 
 

1978 births
Living people
Canadian female tennis players
Czechoslovak emigrants to Canada
Racket sportspeople from Ontario
Sportspeople from Kitchener, Ontario
Tennis players from Prague
Florida Gators women's tennis players
Tennis players at the 1999 Pan American Games
Pan American Games bronze medalists for Canada
Pan American Games medalists in tennis
Medalists at the 1999 Pan American Games